Rear Admiral Hector Roy Mackenzie Woodhouse CB OBE (1889–1971) was a senior Royal Navy officer during the Second World War.

Naval career
Born on 15 February 1889, Hector Mackenzie Woodhouse was educated at Bedford School. He entered in the Royal Navy in 1906 and served during the First World War and during the Second World War.

Rear Admiral Hector Mackenzie Woodhouse was appointed OBE in 1919, and CB in 1941. He retired from the Royal Navy in 1946 and died in Cosham, Hampshire on 5 June 1971.

References

1889 births
1971 deaths
People educated at Bedford School
Royal Navy admirals
Companions of the Order of the Bath
Officers of the Order of the British Empire